Móritz de Vadászüllés is the name of an old Hungarian noble family. It appeared in the 15th century in Vas county. The family's main possession was Vadászüllés, which was destroyed in the 1590s by the Osman army. The family played a role in the life of the county.

The Móritz de Vadászüllés family was related to several important Hungarian and European noble and royal families such as Perneszy de Ostopan, Zrínyi de Brebir, Frangepan, Batthyány, and the House of Esterházy.

Sources 
 Kerekes József, ifj.: A beketfalvi Mórocz-család története : az Esterházy és Széchenyi családok anyai ősei In: Historia, 1931. (4. évf.) 1–2. sz. 18–41. old.
 Nagy Iván: Magyarország családai czímerekkel és nemzékrendi táblákkal. I-XII. Pest 1857-1868
 Kempelen Béla: Magyar nemes családok (I-XI. kötet, Bp., 1911–1932)

Hungarian noble families